UB-83 Upernavik  is a Greenlandic football club based in Upernavik. Founded in 1983, the team plays in the Greenlandic Football Championship.

Stadium
The club plays at the Upernavik Field. The stadium's modernization was financed by the Football Association of Greenland.

References

Football clubs in Greenland
Association football clubs established in 1983